50 Cent: The Money and the Power is an American reality television series which premiered November 6, 2008 on MTV. The show was hosted by 50 Cent and follows the same mold as The Apprentice. It was meant to serve as a "visual companion" to 50 Cent's book The 50th Law, which he co-wrote with Robert Greene, author of The 48 Laws of Power. The show was cancelled after one season.

Format
The show follows fourteen aspiring rap moguls through challenges issued by 50 Cent, with the winner receiving a $100,000 investment from 50 Cent to start his or her own business venture. A panel including G-Unit members Tony Yayo and Lloyd Banks will judge the contestants, along with guests such as Chris Lighty, Ryan Schinman, LL Cool J, DJ Whoo Kid, Miss Info, and former Danity Kane member Aubrey O'Day.

Contestants

Weekly results

Bosses and underbosses

Contestant progress

 The contestant won.
 The contestant was eliminated.
 The contestant was told that they were in risk, but ended up being safe from the chopping block.
 The contestant was in risk of being eliminated, and was on the losing team.
 The contestant was in risk of being eliminated, and was on the winning team.
 The contestant won the challenge, and was not in risk or eliminated.
 The contestant lost the challenge, but was not in risk or eliminated.
 The contestant left the game towards other reasons rather than being put in the chopping block.
 The contestant voluntarily left the competition.

In Episode 2, Nathan won the challenge, and was eliminated because 50 Cent said Nathan was in the game for the wrong reasons.

The Teams were changed in Episode 4 and Dajuan was named boss of Team Money, and Jennifer and Rebecca switched teams.

In Episode 4, Rebecca lost the challenge, and left the game because she felt she didn't need to be there.

In Episode 7, Musso was sent home for losing his temper.

Episodes

References

External links
50 Cent: The Money and the Power on MTV.com
 Website on Muchmusic.com

50 Cent
2008 American television series debuts
2009 American television series endings
2000s American reality television series
African-American reality television series
English-language television shows
MTV original programming